Doble Kara ( / English: Double Kara) is a Philippine melodrama television series, directed by Emmanuel Q. Palo, Trina N. Dayrit, and Jojo A. Saguin, which premiered on ABS-CBN's Kapamilya Gold afternoon block and worldwide on The Filipino Channel on August 24, 2015 to February 10, 2017. The series stars Royal Princess of Drama Julia Montes in a dual role, as Kara Dela Rosa and Sara Suarez, together with an ensemble cast consisting of Carmina Villarroel, Mylene Dizon, Ariel Rivera, Allen Dizon, Sam Milby, Alicia Alonzo, Maxene Magalona, Edgar Allan Guzman, and John Lapus.

The story revolves around identical twin sisters, Kara and Sara, who grew up in a happy family in spite of being poor and whose lives will be intertwined because of love, identity, deceit, ambition, and wealth when destiny teasingly compels to separate their lives. In addition, Doble Kara chronicles the relationship between the twin sisters and their daughters, Isabella Acosta/Rebecca Suarez and Hannah Acosta, as they seek to discover the whereabouts and true identity of Kara's long-lost daughter.

Cast and characters

Main

Supporting

Recurring

Guest

References

Doble Kara
Lists of Philippine television series characters
Lists of drama television characters
Lists of soap opera characters by series